Burwell railway station was on the Cambridge and Mildenhall branch of the Great Eastern Railway.

After the closure of the line, the site of Burwell station was redeveloped, initially as a cardboard factory, and then a few decades later as a housing estate. The names of the streets Station Gate and Railway Close hint at the site's past usage.

References

External links
 Burwell station on navigable 1946 O. S. map
 Burwell at Disused Stations

Disused railway stations in Cambridgeshire
Former Great Eastern Railway stations
Railway stations in Great Britain opened in 1884
Railway stations in Great Britain closed in 1962
railway station